The Palaeontological Museum in Germany (Paläontologisches Museum München), is a German national natural history museum located in the city of Munich, Bavaria. It is associated with the Ludwig-Maximilians-Universität. It has a large collection of fossils of animals and plants such as Mesozoic reptiles, early elephants and saber-toothed cats. The paleontological and geological institute which houses the museum is formally called the Bavarian State Collection for Palaeontology and Geology (Bayerische Staatsammlung für Paläontologie und Geologie, BSPG), which itself is one of several institutions which make up the Bavarian Natural History Collections (Staatliche Naturwissenschaftliche Sammlungen Bayerns, SNSB).

One of its highlights is the specimen of the early bird Archaeopteryx discovered in 1861. The museum is also interesting because of the architecture of its building, the former urban college of arts and crafts.

See also 
List of museums in Germany
List of natural history museums

External links

 Paleontology museums in Munich
BSPG homepage (in German)
BSPG on the SNSB homepage

Museums in Munich
Munich
Fossil museums